The 3rd Cannes International Series Festival is a television festival that took place in Cannes, France. The festival was scheduled to be held on 27 March to 1 April but postponed to 9 to 14 October, due to COVID-19 pandemic-related concerns and was held in-person/virtual hybrid. American writer and director Darren Star served as the patron of the festival edition.

The Best Series of the Festival award went to the Swedish crime drama Partisan.

Juries
The following juries were named for the festival.

Competition
Laëtitia Eïdo, French actress
Grégory Fitoussi, French actor
Randy Kerber, American composer
Roxane Mesquida, French actress
Caroline Proust, French actress and director
Jean-Pascal Zadi, French actor and director

Short Form Competition
Jamie Bamber, British actor
Timothée Hochet, French director and screenwriter
Erin Moriarty, American actress

Official selection

In competition
The following series were selected to compete:

Short Form Competition
The following series were selected to compete:

Out of competition
The following series were screened out of competition:

Awards
The following awards were presented at the festival:
Best Series: Partisan by Amir Chamdin, Fares Fares and Mauricio Molinari
Best Screenplay: Arnaud Malherbe and Marion Festraëts for Moloch
Best Music: Jon Ekstrand and Carl-Johan Sevedag for Top Dog
Special Interpretation Prize: Red Light by Halina Reijn and Carice van Houten
Best Performance: Polina Maksimova for 257 Reasons to Live
Student Prize: Red Light by Halina Reijn and Carice van Houten
Best Short Form Series: Broder by Jonathan Barg, Mauro Pérez Quinteros, Andrés Sehinkman and Leandro Vital
Short Form Prize: Claire and the Elderly by Patrick Bilodeau, Charles Grenier, Edith Morin and Sarah Pellerin

Special awards
The following honorary awards were presented at the festival:
Variety Icon Award: Judith Light
Madame Figaro Rising Star Award: Daisy Edgar-Jones
Excellence Award: Patrick Dempsey
Prix du Public: All the Way Up by Franck Gastambide

References

Events postponed due to the COVID-19 pandemic
2020 in French television